is a Japanese politician. In some English-language Japanese newspapers her family name is romanized as Noono.

She was born in Qiqihar, Manchuria in 1935 and moved to Kagoshima Prefecture at the end of World War II. She graduated from Kagoshima Prefectural Konan High School in 1954 and attended the School of Midwifery attached to the Medical Department of Osaka University.  Nohno worked as a nurse for more than thirty years before beginning her political career.

She was first elected to the House of Councillors in 1992, and was reelected in 1998 and 2004. In 2001 she served as the Vice Minister for Labor for half a year.  Prime Minister Koizumi appointed her Minister of Justice on 27 September 2004.  Her selection was somewhat controversial.  Her background is in medicine, with no formal legal training. She is only the second woman to serve in the position.  The first was Tachiko Nagao, who served for ten months in 1996.

Nohno has spoken in favor of immigration and assimilation of immigrants into Japanese society.

External links 
 http://www.kantei.go.jp/foreign/koizumidaijin/040927/03nohno_e.html
 http://www.c-nohno.com

1935 births
Living people
20th-century Japanese politicians
21st-century Japanese politicians
20th-century Japanese women politicians
21st-century Japanese women politicians
Women government ministers of Japan
Female members of the House of Councillors (Japan)
Japanese expatriates in the United Kingdom
Japanese nurses
Japanese people from Manchukuo
Members of the House of Councillors (Japan)
Ministers of Justice of Japan
Academic staff of Osaka University
Politicians from Kagoshima Prefecture
People from Qiqihar
Women nurses
Female justice ministers